Glenn Layendecker and Byron Talbot were the defending champions, but none competed this year. Layendecker retired from professional tennis at the end of the 1992 season, while Talbot opted to compete at Washington, D.C. during the same week.

Tom Nijssen and Cyril Suk won the title by defeating Gary Muller and Piet Norval 7–6, 6–3 in the final.

Seeds
All seeds received a bye to the second round.

Draw

Finals

Top half

Bottom half

References

External links
 Official results archive (ATP)
 Official results archive (ITF)

Stuttgart Doubles
Doubles 1993